Queñuta (possibly from Aymara qiwña a kind of tree (polylepis), uta house, "qiwña house") is a mountain in the Andes of southern Peru, about  high. It is located in the Tacna Region, Tacna Province, Palca District, near the Chilean border. The mountain lies southeast of Ancochaullane and Huancune.

Queñuta is also the name of an intermittent stream north of the mountain. It flows to Laguna Blanca in the east along an unpopulated place of that name (Queuñuta).

References 

Mountains of Tacna Region
Mountains of Peru